Mark Chao (born 25 September 1984) is a Taiwanese-Canadian actor and model. He made his television debut in the television series Black & White (2009), for which he won the Golden Bell Award for Best Actor. Since then, he has starred in films Monga (2010), Caught in the Web (2012), So Young (2013), Young Detective Dee: Rise of the Sea Dragon (2013), Chronicles of the Ghostly Tribe (2015) and the television series Eternal Love (2017).

Early life
Chao is the son of actor and television host . He graduated from the University of Victoria in Canada, with a double degree in sociology and economics. He started his career in the Taiwanese entertainment industry after he graduated.

Career
Mark Chao made his debut in the television drama Black & White (2009). His role as the rash, righteous and no-nonsense cop shot him to fame and won him the Best Actor award at the 44th Golden Bell Awards. He then starred in his first film, Monga (2010). The gangster flick, directed by Doze Niu grossed more than NT$250 million (HK$61 million) in Taiwan, making it one of the most successful domestic productions. Chao won the Best Newcomer award at the Asian Film Awards for his performance as a solitary, self-loathing and intense gang member. Chao won the Best Actor in Leading Role at the 26th Asian Television Awards (2021).

Chao's successive films boosted his recognition in China. Love (2012), directed by Monga director Doze Niu, became the highest-grossing Taiwanese film in the Mainland. He also starred in First Time alongside Angelababy, and reprised his role as Wu Yingxiong in the prequel of Black and White. The same year, he starred in Caught in the Web directed by Chen Kaige. The film drew than six million viewers and praise from critics. Mark won the Best Actor award for the Hong Kong and Taiwan category at the Huabiao Awards.  
  
Chao then starred in Zhao Wei's directorial debut So Young (2013), playing an ambitious and nerdy China university student. The same year, he played Di Renjie in Young Detective Dee: Rise of the Sea Dragon, the prequel to the popular Detective Dee film directed by Tsui Hark.

Chao once again reprised his role as Wu Yingxiong in Black & White: The Dawn of Justice (2014), the sequel to Black & White Episode I: The Dawn of Assault.
He won the Best Actor award at the 16th Huading Awards for his performance.

Chao was then cast to play Hu Bayi in Chronicles of the Ghostly Tribe (2015), adapted from the best-selling tomb raid novel series Ghost Blows Out the Light. The film, directed by Lu Chuan, was a hit at the box office but received mixed reviews in regard to its faithfulness to the novel. The following year, he starred in the Chinese-French film The Warriors Gate, directed by Matthias Hoene and filmed in English.

Chao made his return to television after 8 years in fantasy romance drama Eternal Love (2017). Though Chao's casting as the beautiful male lead was originally met with criticism, he eventually won praise for his acting. After the series aired, Mark experienced an explosive rise in popularity and increased film offers. Chao ranked 36th on Forbes China Celebrity 100 list in 2017. 

In 2018, Chao starred in the romance film Till the End of the World, which was shot in Antarctica. He is also set to reprise his role in Detective Dee: The Four Heavenly Kings. The same year, Chao was cast in Lou Ye's period drama film Saturday Fiction. 

Chao is set to return to the small screen with the Chinese remake of South Korean television series Misaeng, titled Ordinary Glory.

Personal life
Mark married Chinese actress Gao Yuanyuan in 2014. The two met on the set of Caught in the Web  and welcomed a daughter - Rhea Chao in June 2019, one month after announcing that Gao was pregnant.

Filmography

Film

Television series

Discography

Awards and nominations

References

External links
 
 Mark Chao at chinesemov.com

1984 births
Living people
21st-century Taiwanese male actors
Taiwanese male film actors
Taiwanese male television actors
Male actors from Taipei
Naturalized citizens of Canada
University of Victoria alumni
Best Newcomer Asian Film Award winners